Ayanda Patosi (born 31 October 1992) is a South African professional soccer player who plays as a left winger.

Club career

Early career
At the age of 16, Patosi trained with Belgian club Genk. He spent the 2010–11 season with ASD Cape Town, and Patosi later returned to Belgium on a tour with the African Soccer Development school. While there, Patosi signed a four-year contract with Lokeren in May 2011.

He made his professional debut for Lokeren in the 2011–12 season, winning the Belgian Cup that same year.

Cape Town City
On 1 June 2017, Cape Town City announced via their official Twitter profile that they had signed Patosi from Lokeren on a free transfer. On 12 August, he made his debut for the club as a substitute in a MTN 8 cup match against Polokwane City, replacing Sibusiso Masina in a 0–1 win. Eleven days later, he made his first league start in a 3–1 win over Platinum Stars in which he scored his first goal for the club.

Loan to Esteghlal

In January 2019, Patosi signed for Iranian side Esteghlal on loan for the remainder of the season, with the club retaining the option to purchase. He became the first South African player to join an Iranian team. He was assigned the number 5 shirt. His transfer was delayed as Football Federation Islamic Republic of Iran was waiting for South African Football Association to prove that Patosi had played international soccer in the last two years and he has decent international quality.

Patosi made his debut for the club on 20 February in a 2–0 win against Pars Jonoubi Jam, scoring the second goal. Esteghlal's first goal was also a deflected corner kick from Patosi by opponent Emad Mirjavan into their own net. On 1 June, Esteghlal decided not to opt their option to sign Patosi on permanent basis. Three days later, he announced on his Instagram his spell with the club has ended and he would not stay in the club for another season.

Loan to Baniyas
After returning to Cape Town, he was linked with a transfer away from the club.

On 14 July 2019, Patosi signed for Emarati side Baniyas on a season-long loan deal with the option to buy, reuniting with Winfried Schäfer, his former coach at Esteghlal. He made his debut in a 2–2 draw against Ajman Club in which he scored his team's equalizing goal.

Foolad

On 9 January 2020, Patosi returned to Iran and signed a six-month loan deal with Foolad. On 2 February, he made his debut for the club in a 2–1 defeat against Sepahan. On 14 February, he scored his first goal for the club in a 2–1 victory against Paykan. Patosi was mostly left out of Foolad's squad by the manager Javad Nekounam due to weight issues following his return to soccer after the temporary suspension due to the coronavirus pandemic.

On 11 September 2020, Cape Town City and Foolad reached an agreement for the permanent transfer of Patosi to Foolad with the player agreeing to a two year contract. He left Fooled in January 2023.

International career
Patosi was tipped in March 2012 by fellow player Anele Ngcongca as a possible future star of the South African national team. In November 2012, Patosi was hailed as a "sensation" and there were calls for him to be included in the national team set-up. He received his first call-up to the national team in December 2012. Patosi made his international debut on 12 October 2013, in a friendly match against Morocco, alongside fellow players Sibusiso Vilakazi and Kgosi Nthle.

In December 2014 he was announced as being part of South Africa's provisional squad for the 2015 Africa Cup of Nations. He did not make the final, 23-man squad.

Personal life
Patosi was born in Khayelitsha, Cape Town, South Africa. His father died when he was eleven and he was raised by his mother Nombulelo. In June 2014, he was a victim of a carjacking when he was in Gugulethu in Cape Town during the season break. The carjackers stole his car, however, Patosi was able to escape safely.

Career statistics

Club

International

Scores and results list South Africa's goal tally first, score column indicates score after each Patosi goal.

Honours

Club
Lokeren
Belgian Cup: 2011–12, 2013–14

Cape Town City
MTN 8: 2018

Foolad 
Hazfi Cup (1): 2020–21
Iranian Super Cup: 2021

References

1992 births
Living people
Soccer players from Cape Town
South African soccer players
South Africa international soccer players
K.S.C. Lokeren Oost-Vlaanderen players
Cape Town City F.C. (2016) players
Esteghlal F.C. players
Baniyas Club players
Foolad FC players
Belgian Pro League players
South African Premier Division players
Persian Gulf Pro League players
Association football wingers
South African expatriate soccer players
South African expatriate sportspeople in Belgium
Expatriate footballers in Belgium
South African expatriates in Iran
Expatriate footballers in Iran
South African expatriate sportspeople in the United Arab Emirates
Expatriate footballers in the United Arab Emirates